Isostyla ithomeina is a moth of the family Notodontidae first described by Arthur Gardiner Butler in 1872. It is found in Panama and Costa Rica.

Larvae have been reared on palms of the genus Asterogyne.

References

Moths described in 1872
Notodontidae
Moths of Central America